The coat of arms of the city of Paris (French: Blason de Paris) shows a silver sailing ship on waves of the sea in a red field, with a chief showing the Royal emblem of gold-on-blue fleur-de-lis. Originally introduced in the 14th century, its current form dates to 1853. The city motto is Fluctuat nec mergitur ("[She] is tossed [by the waves], but does not sink"). The traditional colors of the city of Paris are red and blue.

History

The Marchands de l'eau (hanse parisienne des marchands de l'eau) were a corporation or guild established by royal privilege in 1170 with the right for commercial navigation on the Seine between Paris and Mantes. Their seal in c. 1210 showed a river boat. By the mid-14th century, the members of the guild, known as the hansés, became the most influential faction in the city, and their emblem, now represented as a sailing-vessel bearing the royal fleur-de-lis as its emblem, came to be used as the city coat of arms. The first recorded use of the coat of arms dates to 1358. The city colors of red and blue also date to 1358, introduced by Étienne Marcel.  In the 15th century, the coat of arms is shown as a red a ship argent (without the waves) with the Capetian arms in chief, at the time azure, three fleurs-de-lis or. The use of  semé-de-lis (France ancien) is attested for the early 16th century.

When the French Revolution abolished the nobility by the decree of 20 June 1790, it simultaneously disallowed all emblems or coats of arms. The municipality of Paris quickly complied, and abolished its own arms in November of that same year.

It was not until the First French Empire that new cities were officially allowed to have arms. For Paris, this resulted in the Letters Patent granted to the city of Paris by Napoleon on 29 January 1811. In the Letters Patent of Louis XVIII in 1817, the coat of arms of Paris was restored in its traditional form, except for the chief, where the fleur-de-lis were replaced by the three bees used by Napoleon (attributed to the Merovingian kings, especially Childeric I).

The July Monarchy re-introduced the old (pre-revolutionary) coat of arms. Under the French Second Republic (1848–1852), the fleurs-de-lis were replaced by stars.

Under the Second French Empire, the old coat-of-arms was once again restored. The motto Fluctuat nec mergitur dates to the same time, officially introduced by a decree dated 24 November 1853, by Baron Haussmann, then prefect of the Seine. It has been part of the full coat of arms since that time.

Additions made to the full achievement of the coat of arms in modern times include three badges, for:
 the Legion of Honor (decree of 9 October 1900);
 the Croix de Guerre 1914-1918 (Decree of 28 July 1919);
 the Ordre de la Libération (decree of 24 March 1945).

Motto

 ("[she] is rocked [by the waves], but does not sink";  or Il est battu par les flots, mais ne sombre pas) is the Latin motto of the city of Paris.

The motto originates as an abbreviation of a longer Latin distich, 
Niteris incassum navem submergere Petri / Fluctuat at numquam mergitur illa ratis.
"In vain you strive to submerge the ship of Peter — this vessel rocks but is never submerged."
This verse is medieval, attributed to either Pope Gregory IX or Pope Innocent IV in the context of the war against Frederick II, in which Frederick had destroyed the Genoese fleet.
The tradition of attribution to these 13th-century popes, while it may itself be spurious, has a manuscript tradition going back to at least the 15th century. The verse is mentioned in print in 1567, by Matthias Flacius.

The abbreviated verse first appears in connection with Paris, on coins (jetons), in the 1580s. Before the 19th century, it was one of the mottoes associated with Paris, neither officially, nor exclusively. It was historically also associated with the city of Aimargues.

Its official adoption as the motto of the city of Paris dates to 24 November 1853, in connection with the renovation of Paris led by Georges-Eugène Haussmann. It was included as the heraldic motto with the city's coat of arms from this time.

The motto is part of the official livery of the Paris Fire Brigade. Following the November 2015 Paris attacks, the Latin-language motto had a surge in popularity and was used in social media as a symbol of Paris' resistance in the face of terrorism.

Contemporary use

The coat of arms is to be found on many Parisian public buildings, including the Hôtel de Ville, the mairies of the 20 arrondissements, the train stations, the bridges, and primary and secondary schools, and la Sorbonne. Today, the police headquarters of Paris uses a logo inspired by the coat of arms of the city of Paris. It was also represented on a postage stamp issued in 1965, the 0.30 franc "Blason de Paris". It is also used as the Garde républicaine's insignia.

References

 Marc Declerck, Les armoiries de Paris, L'Harmattan, 2007
A. Coëtlogon, M.-L. Tisserand, "Les devises de la ville de Paris", Les Armoires de la Ville de Paris (1874), 180–189.

External links

Paris
Government of Paris
Culture of Paris
History of Paris
Paris
Paris
Paris
Paris
Paris